Ammar Al-Ibrahim (born 1 July 1997) is a Saudi Arabian professional footballer who plays for Al-Omran as a winger.

Career
Al-Ibrahim started his career at the youth team of Al-Fateh and represented the club at every level except the senior level, he then played with Al-Oyoon and Al-Anwar in Saudi Third Division and succeeded in climbing with Al-Anwar from Saudi Third Division to the Saudi Second Division in the 2018–2019 season and he succeeded in scoring the goal of the ascent against Tuwaiq, On 26 October 2020, Al-Ibrahim joined Al-Ain.

References

External links
 

1997 births
Living people
Saudi Arabian footballers
Saudi Arabia youth international footballers
Association football wingers
Al-Fateh SC players
Al Oyoon FC players
Al-Anwar Club players
Al-Ain FC (Saudi Arabia) players
Al Omran Club players
Saudi Fourth Division players
Saudi Second Division players
Saudi Professional League players
Saudi Third Division players
Saudi Arabian Shia Muslims